Beck Dorey-Stein (born June 11, 1986) is an author and former stenographer in the White House from 2012 to 2017 under U.S. Presidents Barack Obama and Donald Trump. She is the author of the non-fiction book From the Corner of the Oval which recounts her years providing stenography services to the President. Dorey-Stein was one of three stenographers who traveled with the President.

References

Living people
Stenographers
21st-century American non-fiction writers
1986 births
Obama administration personnel
People from Narberth, Pennsylvania
Wesleyan University alumni